Hare Street is a road in the Indian city of Kolkata, in Kolkata district, West Bengal, India. It connects the junction of Council House Street and Netaji Subhas Road in B.B.D. Bagh to Millennium Park on Strand Road.

History
Hare Street was constructed by the Lottery Committee.

David Hare (1775–1842), Scottish watch-maker, philanthropist and educator, used to live at Nicco House situated here and the street is named after him.

Geography

Police district
Hare Street police station is part of the Central division of Kolkata Police. It is located at 42, Chittaranjan Avenue, Kolkata-700069.

Taltala Women police station covers all police districts under the jurisdiction of the Central division, i.e. Bowbazar, Burrabazar, Girish Park, Hare Street, Jorasanko, Muchipara, New Market, Taltala and Posta.

References

Roads in Kolkata